Tailby Meadow is a 4.9 hectare Local Nature Reserve in Desborough in Northamptonshire. It is owned by Kettering Borough Council and managed by the Wildlife Trust for Bedfordshire, Cambridgeshire and Northamptonshire.

Artificial fertilisers have never been used on this hay meadow, and it has not been ploughed for several hundred years. There are fifteen species of grass and diverse wild flowers, including black knapweed, lady's bedstraw and lady's smock, which is a food source for the orange tip butterfly.

The site can be accessed from the leisure centre off The Broadlands.

References

Wildlife Trust for Bedfordshire, Cambridgeshire and Northamptonshire reserves
Local Nature Reserves in Northamptonshire
Desborough